A royal consort is a spouse of a monarch. The Kingdom of Tahiti was founded by Pōmare I (known as Tu) between 1788 and 1791. His dynasty lasted until his great-grandson Pōmare V abdicated in 1880 and the French annexed Tahiti and its dependencies to form French Polynesia.

Pōmare Dynasty

References

Bibliography 

Tahiti
Pōmare dynasty
Tahitian women
Tahiti, List of royal consorts of